The Czech lands or the Bohemian lands are the three historical regions of Bohemia, Moravia, and Czech Silesia. Together the three have formed the Czech part of Czechoslovakia since 1918, the Czech Socialist Republic since 1 January 1969 and the Czech Republic since 1 January 1993. The Czech lands are also referred to as Czechia.

In a historical context, Czech texts use the term to refer to any territory ruled by the Kings of Bohemia, i.e., the lands of the Bohemian Crown as established by Emperor Charles IV in the 14th century. This would include territories like the Lusatias (which in 1635 fell to Saxony) and the whole of Silesia, all ruled from Prague Castle at that time. After the conquest of Silesia by the Prussian king Frederick the Great in 1742, the remaining lands of the Bohemian Crown—Bohemia, Moravia and Austrian Silesia—have been more or less co-extensive with the territory of the modern-day Czech Republic.

Alternative names

The term Czech lands has been used to describe different things by different people. While the Czech name of Bohemia proper is Čechy, the adjective český refers to both "Bohemian" and "Czech". The non-auxiliary term (i.e. the term used in official Czech geographical terminology lists) for the present-day Czech lands (i.e. Bohemia, Moravia, Czech Silesia) is Česko, documented as early as 1704. The official translation of the word Česko is Czechia.

During the period of the First and Second Czechoslovak Republic the Czech lands were frequently referred to as Historical lands in particular when mentioned together with Slovakia (which was never an autonomous historical region within the Kingdom of Hungary).

History

The Bohemian lands had been settled by Celts (Boii) from 5th BC until 2nd AD, then by various Germanic tribes (Marcomanni, Quadi, Lombards and others) until they moved on to the west during the Migration Period (1st-5th century). At the beginning of the 5th century the population decreased vigorously and, according to mythology led by a chieftain Čech, the first Western Slavs came in the second half of the 6th century. In the course of the decline of the Great Moravian realm during the Hungarian invasions of Europe in the 9th and 10th century, the Czech Přemyslid dynasty established the Duchy of Bohemia. Backed by the East Frankish kings, they prevailed against the reluctant Bohemian nobility and extended their rule eastwards over the adjacent Moravian lands.

In 1198 Duke Ottokar I of Bohemia received the royal title by the German anti-king Philip of Swabia. Attached to his Kingdom of Bohemia was the Margraviate of Moravia established in 1182 and Kłodzko Land, the later County of Kladsko. From the second part of the 13th century onwards, German colonists ("German Bohemians") settled in the mountainous border area on the basis of the kings' invitation during the Ostsiedlung (in Prague they lived already from the early 12th century) and lived alongside the Slavs.

The Silesian lands north of the Sudetes mountain range had been ruled by the Polish Piast dynasty from the 10th century onwards. While Bohemia rose to a kingdom, the Silesian Piasts alienated from the fragmenting Kingdom of Poland. After in 1310 the Bohemian crown had passed to the mighty House of Luxembourg, nearly all Silesian dukes pledged allegiance to King John the Blind and in 1335 the Polish king Casimir III the Great officially renounced Silesia by the Treaty of Trentschin. King John had also acquired the lands of Bautzen and Görlitz (later Upper Lusatia) in 1319 and 1329. His son and successor Charles IV, also King of the Romans since 1346, incorporated the Silesian and Lusatian estates into the Bohemian Crown and upon his coronation as Holy Roman Emperor confirmed their indivisibility and affiliation with the Holy Roman Empire.

In 1367 Emperor Charles IV also purchased the former March of Lusatia (Lower Lusatia) in the northwest.  However,  during the Thirty Years' War both Lusatias passed to the Electorate of Saxony by the Peace of Prague. After the Bohemian Crown (Crown of Saint Wenceslas) passed to the House of Habsburg in 1526, the Bohemian crown lands together with the Kingdom of Hungary and the Austrian "hereditary lands" became part of the larger Habsburg monarchy. In 1742 the Habsburg queen Maria Theresa lost the bulk of Silesia to Prussia upon the First Silesian War, part of the War of the Austrian Succession.

Coats of arms
 The coat of arms of the Czech Republic incorporates those of the three integral Czech lands: Bohemia proper, Moravia, and Czech Silesia. The arms of Bohemia originated with the Bohemian kingdom, like those of Moravia with the Moravian margraviate. The arms of Czech Silesia originated as those of all of the historical region of Silesia, much of which is now in Poland.

See also

Protectorate of Bohemia and Moravia
Kłodzko Land

References

Sources

.
.
Historical regions in the Czech Republic
Geography of the Czech Republic
History of Bohemia
History of Czech Silesia
History of Moravia
History of Austria-Hungary
Crown land
Boii
Czech lands under Habsburg rule